Gun laws in Washington may refer to gun laws in either of two jurisdictions in the United States:

 Gun laws in Washington state
 Gun laws in Washington, D.C.

See also 
 Washington (disambiguation)
 , enacted by Congress in Washington, D.C.